Luz Marina Virginia Geerman (born 27 February 1984) is a sprinter who competed internationally for Aruba at the 2000 Summer Olympics.

Career
Geerman was just 16 years old when she competed at the 2000 Summer Olympics held in Sydney, Australia, she entered the 100 metres, she ran in heat 3 and with a finishing time of 12.96 seconds she finished 8th in her heat and overall 76th out of 84 starters.

References

1984 births
Living people
Aruban female sprinters
Olympic athletes of Aruba
Athletes (track and field) at the 2000 Summer Olympics
Olympic female sprinters